The Royal Caledonian Society of South Australia was founded in Adelaide in 1881 as the South Australian Caledonian Society to promote Scottish culture and traditions in South Australia.

History
Foundation members included A. W. Dobbie and Patrick Gay.

Chiefs

1881–1883 Alexander Hay MLC.
1883–1885 Dr. Allan Campbell MLC.
1885–1886 Hon. Sir J. Lancelot Stirling
1886–1887 Hon. James Henderson Howe MLC.
1887–1888 David Murray
1888–1891 Aloysius MacDonald
1891–1892 Hugh Fraser
1892–1894 Hon. John Darling MLC.
1894–1895 Aloysius MacDonald
1895–1897 Hon. A. Wallace Sandford MLC.
1897–1899 John Wyles JP.
1899–1902 A. J. McLachlan
1902–1903 G. Fowler Stewart
1903–1904 P. D. Haggart
1904–1907 John Darling Jr.
1907–1909 John Wood Sandford
1909–1914 Robert Weymss
1914–1917 George McEwin
1917–1918 John Drummond
1918–1921 J. W. Hill
1921–1923 Duncan Fraser SM.
1924–1925 James W. McGregor
1925–1928 Andrew Douglas Young
1928–1930 John Tassie, brother of Henry Tassie
1930–1933 Hon. Sir David J. Gordon MLC.
1933–1936 Maxwell A. Fotheringham
1936–1938 Hon. Sir George Ritchie, KCMG
1938–1940 C. B. Anderson ISO.
1940–1943 Capt. Duncan Menzies
1943–1945 John McLeay
1945–1949 Andrew Small
1949–1952 F. R. Forgan JP.
1952–1954 J. McGregor Soutar
1954–1959 Norman H. Campbell
1959–1968 Sir Lyell McEwin KBE., MLC.
1968–1971 Clarrie Martin
1971–1980 Charles Gardiner
1980–1983 Ron A. Layton
1983–1985 Donaldina Nicolson Richards
1985–1986 Dr. Gordon C. Greig MB MRCGP
1987–1989 Marian Macaulay Johnson
1989–1993 William Paterson
1993–1995 Jeffrey C. McFarlane
1995–2000 J. Lennox Pawson JP.
2000–2003 Ann Calver (née Lumsden)
2003–2004 Jim D. Wallace
2004–2007 David Porteous
2007–2010 Anne Miller
2010–2012 Christina Forbes Cockerill
2012–present (2015) Roselee Bruce

Activities
The Caledonian Society commissioned W. J. Maxwell to produce the statue of Robert Burns on North Terrace, which was unveiled on 5 May 1894. They commissioned James White to produce the statue  of John McDouall Stuart in Victoria Square commemorating his crossing of the continent in 1861–1862. The statue, paid for by public subscription and the South Australian Government, was unveiled on 4 June 1904.

References

External links
Royal Caledonian Society of South Australia official website

1881 establishments in Australia
Organisations based in Adelaide
Clubs and societies in South Australia
Culture of South Australia
Organisations based in Australia with royal patronage